Park Jun-Hyuk  (born 11 April 1987) is a South Korean footballer who plays as a goalkeeper who plays for Cheonan City FC.

Club career
Park started his career at Gyeongnam FC, being one of the club's picks from the 2010 K-League Draft.  Unused by Gyeongnam FC during the 2010 K-League season, Park joined Daegu FC in February 2011 on a free transfer. On 16 March 2011, Park made his professional debut in a 0 – 2 League Cup loss to his former club, Gyeongnam FC.

He started his military duty in December 2015. However, on 16th July 2016, due to his personal issues, he returned to Seongnam FC and his duty was replaced as a supplementary service.

In 2017, he joined Pocheon Citizen FC of K3 League Advanced as a social service agent and contributed the club to earn the championship of the league and was awarded as the best goalkeeper of 2017 K3 League Advanced.

In January 2018, Jun-hyuk left Pocheon Citizen FC and terminated the contract with Seongnam FC. In July, he joined Daejeon Citizen of K League 2 for half of the year.

In 2019, he joined Jeonnam Dragons. He had contributed the club to the championship of 2021 Korean FA Cup. However, on 4th January 2022, he left the club as the contract was over.

On 22 February 2022, Jun-hyuk joined Cheonan City FC of K3 League.

Club career statistics

References

External links 

1987 births
Living people
Association football goalkeepers
South Korean footballers
Gyeongnam FC players
Daegu FC players
Jeju United FC players
Seongnam FC players
Pocheon Citizen FC players
Daejeon Hana Citizen FC players
Jeonnam Dragons players
Cheonan City FC players
K League 1 players
K3 League (2007–2019) players
K League 2 players
K3 League players